Theodore Blake Wirgman (29 April 1848 – 16 January 1925) was a British painter and etcher who moved to London, studied at the Royal Academy Schools, became a painter of history and genre subjects, and worked as a portrait artist for The Graphic.  A number of these portraits are held at the National Portrait Gallery.

Early life and family
Theodore Blake Wirgman was born in Belgium and died in London.  He and his siblings, Charles Wirgman (1832–1860), Thomas Ernest (1834–1907), Francis Wirgman (1837–1860), Clara Emma (1841-1905), Helen Augusta (1843-1906), George Ferdinand (1845–1923) and Arthur David (1846–1925), were the sons of Ferdinand Charles Wirgman Russell (1806–1858) and Frances Letitia Diggins (1812–1891).  The Wirgman ancestral family had been successful silversmiths who had come to London from Sweden early in the 18th century. Thomas Wirgman Upjohn, Theodore Blake's grandfather, wrote books on Kant, the German philosopher.  Several of Theodore Blake's siblings died in infancy.  His sister Clara E. married into the French family Thevenard, and his brother George F. emigrated to Uruguay, and had 16 children with Celedonia Guerrero Muñoz.

Career
He worked from a studio at 24 Dawson Place, Notting Hill, London, and joined The Arts Club in 1892.

Wirgman was part of a group of avant-garde young artists who emulated Edward Burne-Jones and Simeon Solomon. This group was made up of Walter Crane, Robert Bateman, Harry Ellis Wooldridge and Edward Clifford.

References

DAAO Charles Wirgman at www.daao.org.au

Bibliography
Bénézit, E., Dictionnaire des Peintres, Sculpteurs, Dessinateurs et Graveurs, 8 vols, Paris, 1956–61.

External links

 Portrait of Marjory and Dorothy Lees in the collection at Gallery Oldham. 
 

1848 births
1925 deaths
19th-century English painters
English male painters
20th-century English painters
British genre painters
Artists' Rifles soldiers
20th-century English male artists
19th-century English male artists